Tropidopola is a genus of grasshoppers, erected by Carl Stål in 1873.  It is the type genus of the monotypic tribe Tropidopolini and the subfamily Tropidopolinae.
Species are distributed in: central-northern Africa, southern Europe and Asia: near East, India up to Siberia.

Species
The Orthoptera Species File lists:
 Tropidopola cylindrica (Marschall, 1836) - type species (as Opsomala fasciculata Charpentier = T. cylindrica cylindrica, one of 4 subspecies)
 Tropidopola daurica Uvarov, 1926
 Tropidopola graeca Uvarov, 1926
 Tropidopola longicornis (Fieber, 1853)
 Tropidopola nigerica Uvarov, 1937
 Tropidopola syriaca (Walker, 1871)
 Tropidopola turanica Uvarov, 1926

References

External Links 
 
 

Acrididae genera
Orthoptera of Asia
Orthoptera of Africa
Orthoptera of Europe